Sau Mau Ping is an area part of Kwun Tong District, in eastern Kowloon, Hong Kong.

Name
Its Chinese name was formerly So Mau Ping, but this was often mis-rendered So Mo Ping, meaning a place to 'visit one's ancestors'. In fact, during World War II, much of the area was used as a cemetery. The Chinese name was considered inappropriate for a residential area and so it was changed to the current one, meaning "nice and prosperous".

Features
Sau Mau Ping was part of the early Kwun Tong satellite city in Hong Kong. Sau Mau Ping Estate, Hiu Lai Court and Po Tat Estate are major public housing estates in the area. There is a shopping mall below Po Tat Estate.

The United Christian Hospital, serving all of eastern Kowloon, is located in Sau Mau Ping. The hospital was founded in 1973 and is currently undergoing a major expansion scheduled for completion in 2023.

Transportation
Roads
 On Sau Road runs through Sau Mau Ping
 Sau Mau Ping Road
 Hiu Kwong Street
 Tseung Kwan O Tunnel links Sau Mau Ping to Tseung Kwan O

MTR
Current nearest station is Kwun Tong station, which can take minibus or bus to travel. The East Kowloon line was proposed as a new MTR line in 2014, with a recommended completion time in 2025 to 2030. The new line would include the Sau Mau Ping station and Po Tat station, serving the area.

Education
Sau Mau Ping is in Primary One Admission (POA) School Net 48. Within the school net are multiple aided schools (operated independently but funded with government money) and Kwun Tong Government Primary School.

See also
List of places in Hong Kong

References

 
New Kowloon